Ash-Shatat is a 29-part Syrian television series produced in 2003 by a private Syrian film company, Linn, at a cost of $5.1m. Based in part on The Protocols of the Elders of Zion, the series reflects anti-Semitic stereotypes and themes. It depicts Jews engaging in a conspiracy to rule the world, and repeats traditional blood libels against Jews, such as the murder of Christian children and the use of their blood to bake matzah.

Although it was produced in Syria and the closing credits give "special thanks" to various Syrian government entities (including the security ministry, the culture ministry, the Damascus Police Command, and the Department of Antiquities and Museums), Syrian national television "declined to air the program". Ash-Shatat was shown on Lebanon's Al-Manar, before being dropped. "Al Manar management apologized for airing the series, dropped it and explained that the Station had purchased it without first viewing the entire series." The series was shown in Iran in 2004, and in Jordan during October 2005 on Al-Mamnou, a Jordanian satellite network.

See also 
 List of Syrian television series
Contemporary imprints of The Protocols of the Elders of Zion

References

 

2000s Syrian television series
Blood libel
Antisemitism in Syria
Protocols of the Elders of Zion
Antisemitic propaganda
2003 Syrian television series debuts
2003 Syrian television series endings
Syrian historical television series